Jackson Township is one of fourteen townships in Shelby County, Indiana. As of the 2010 census, its population was 1,844 and it contained 738 housing units.

History

Jackson Township was established in 1840.

St. George Lutheran Church was listed on the National Register of Historic Places in 1984.

Geography

Cities and towns
 Edinburgh (partial)

Unincorporated towns
 Mount Auburn

References

External links
 Indiana Township Association
 United Township Association of Indiana

Townships in Shelby County, Indiana
Townships in Indiana